Andreas Weigand (born September 29, 1945) is an American sprint canoer who competed from the late 1960s to the mid-1970s. Competing in three Summer Olympics, he earned his best finish of sixth in the C-2 1000 m event at Munich in 1972.

References
Sports-reference.com profile

1945 births
American male canoeists
Canoeists at the 1968 Summer Olympics
Canoeists at the 1972 Summer Olympics
Canoeists at the 1976 Summer Olympics
Living people
Olympic canoeists of the United States